is a Japanese football player. He plays for Maruyasu Okazaki.

Club statistics

References

External links

J. League (#24)

1989 births
Living people
Chukyo University alumni
Association football people from Aichi Prefecture
Japanese footballers
J2 League players
Japan Football League players
Gainare Tottori players
FC Maruyasu Okazaki players
Association football midfielders